A reverse slope defence is a military tactic where a defending force is positioned on the slope of an elevated terrain feature such as a hill, ridge, or mountain, on the side opposite from the attacking force.  This tactic both hinders the attacker's ability to observe the defender's positions and reduces the effectiveness of the attacker's long-range weapons such as tanks and artillery.

A defending unit usually does not conduct a reverse-slope defence along its entire front, as positioning troops on the forward slope is necessary to control the region in front of the hill. However, when enemy forces are known to have superior long-range direct-fire or indirect-fire weapons, the majority of the defending force can use the hill to limit enemy observation and reduce the effectiveness of the long-range enemy fire. This tactic may even succeed in deceiving the enemy as to the true location and organisation of the main defensive positions. Typically, a smaller unit is still posted on the forward slope to perform observation and delay attackers if the defending force needs to relocate its main body onto the forward slope. Otherwise, when the attacker advances and passes over the top of the hill, they may be ambushed by short-range fire from the defender on the reverse slope and perhaps on the counterslope (the forward slope of a hill facing the reverse slope). Combat vehicles are  vulnerable when cresting hills, because their thin belly armour may be exposed to troops on the reverse slope and because their weapons may lack the depression angle to effectively engage an enemy located below the vehicle.

Historical examples

Napoleonic Wars 

The best-known proponent of the tactic was the Duke of Wellington, who used it repeatedly during the Napoleonic Wars to defeat French infantry, such as at the Battle of Waterloo.  By placing a ridge between his own army and his opponent's, and having his troops lie down, Wellington was able both to better protect his troops from French artillery fire and to strike the attacking French infantry by having his troops stand up at the last moment and deliver volleys of musketry at close range. At Waterloo, the last major military engagement of the Napoleonic Wars, Wellington utilized this tactic to drive away a last minute infantry attack by the French in a final attempt to gain victory by Napoleon. The French infantry had climbed a ridge only to find it seemingly abandoned and covered with dead. Suddenly, 1,500 British Foot Guards under Maitland who had been lying down under the ridge rose and unleashed upon them close range, point-blank volleys, killing 300 with the very first volley alone, resulting in the decimation of a large part of Napoleon's elite infantry reserve, the hitherto undefeated Imperial Guard, followed by a British charge which resulted in the retreat and collapse of the French lines, turning the tide of the Battle into a decisive Anglo-Prussian victory and marking the end of the Napoleonic Wars.

American Civil War 

Examples of reverse slope defense during the American Civil War included Stonewall Jackson's defense of Henry House Hill during the First Battle of Bull Run (also known as Manassas) (1861), where he ordered his soldiers to lie down below the crest of the hill in order to avoid Union artillery, and Winfield Scott Hancock's counter-attack against Jubal Early at the Battle of Williamsburg (1862). The Battle of Gettysburg (1863) was another example, especially the Union defense against Pickett's Charge, which was greatly aided by the reverse slope of Cemetery Ridge that both protected and hid infantry and large numbers of cannons that could not be easily seen by the attackers.

World War I 

Germany employed the reverse slope defence on the Hindenburg Line on the Western Front during the latter part of World War I. The belligerents on both sides on the Western Front had settled into a war of attrition fought from established trenches. Patches of territory were won or lost only at great cost. Years of attrition had left both sides stretched thin in manpower and materiel along the front. Germany recognised this problem early and devised Operation Alberich as an answer to it. Operation Alberich involved the construction, through the late winter of 1917, of a new and shorter line (the Hindenburg Line) of defensive fortifications along a high ridge using reverse slope techniques, with massive artillery gun placements protected to the rear by the topography of the ridge, followed by a strategic retreat from their existing tattered front to positions behind the new line.

World War II 

After the capture of Carentan by American paratroopers, German forces (elements of the 17th SS Panzergrenadier Division and 6th Fallschirmjäger Regiment) counterattacked in an attempt to recapture this strategically vital town on 13 June 1944. Elements of the U.S. 101st Airborne Division (502nd and 506th Parachute Infantry Regiments (PIR)) met the enemy advance southwest of Carentan at the Battle of Bloody Gulch.

The terrain offered the Americans the opportunity of a reverse slope defence, and three companies of the 506th PIR lined up along the hedgerows at the bottom of Hill 30.  The American troops were outnumbered and being hit with tank and assault gun fire, but the reverse incline enabled them to direct all their firepower at the Germans as they appeared over the top of the hill. Although they were almost overrun, their position gave them enough of an advantage to hold their ground until they were relieved by the U.S. 2nd Armored Division.

Reverse slope defenses were very popular with the Japanese during the island campaigns in the Pacific theater. American superiority in naval support artillery prompted the Japanese to shelter on reverse slopes until they could engage American troops at close range.

Other examples 
 In the 1966 Battle of Long Tan.
 Valley of Tears, during the 1973 Yom Kippur War
 In the 1982 Battle of Wireless Ridge, Argentine defensive positions were positioned on the forward slopes. The British 2nd Battalion, The Parachute Regiment (2 Para) occupied Argentine positions on a reverse slope, protected from Argentine artillery fire.
 In the 1991 Battle of 73 Easting, M1A1 tanks of Eagle Troop led by Captain McMaster crested a hill and surprised an Iraqi tank company set up in a reverse slope defence on the 70 Easting. They immediately engaged the Iraqi tanks and destroyed the company.

See also 
Hull-down
Defilade

References

External links 
"Reverse slope defense" - globalsecurity.org
"Terrain Considerations in the Defense" - fas.org
"Methods of Employing Tanks with Infantry" (see section 11, "Tanks with Infantry") - lonesentry.com

Reverse slope